Winning Girls Through Psychic Mind Control is a 2002 American comedy film directed by Barry Alexander Brown and starring Bronson Pinchot and Ruben Santiago-Hudson.

Plot

Cast
Bronson Pinchot as Devon Sharpe
Ruben Santiago-Hudson as Samuel Menendez
Amy Carlson as Kathy
Christopher Murney as Albert
Amy Wright as Psychiatrist
Larry Clarke as Bob
Lana Quintal as Camilla
Lauren Braddock as Sarah
Stuart Zamsky as Drunk on steps
Kimberley Wurster as Store Owner/Complaining Wife
Henry Yuk as Maintenance Guy
Hugh Karraker as Father of the Bride
Lucia Grillo as Woman on Bench
June Leroy as Woman asking life's purpose
Regina Spektor as Girl who lost ring

Reception
The film has a 60% rating on Rotten Tomatoes.  Maitland McDonagh of TV Guide awarded the film three stars out of five.

References

External links
 
 
 

American comedy films
Films directed by Barry Alexander Brown
2000s English-language films
2000s American films